This is a list of electoral results for the Electoral district of Croydon in South Australian state elections.

Members for Croydon

Election results

Elections in the 2020s

Elections in the 2010s

Elections in the 2000s

References

SA elections archive: Antony Green ABC
2002 SA election: Antony Green ABC

South Australian state electoral results by district